AAPP may refer to:

 American Academy of Private Physicians, a United States association of private doctors
 Assistance Association for Political Prisoners, an independent non-profit organisation
 Association for the Advancement of Philosophy and Psychiatry, USA
 Association of Asian Parliaments for Peace